Francisco Portillo Soler (born 13 June 1990) is a Spanish professional footballer who plays for UD Almería as an attacking midfielder.

Club career
Born in Málaga, Andalusia, Portillo emerged through local Málaga CF's youth ranks. He first appeared with the first team in the 2009 pre-season, being considered player of the match in the 1–0 win against Aston Villa for the Peace Cup on 25 July.

Portillo made his La Liga debut on 24 January 2010, replacing the injured Patrick Mtiliga in the 74th minute of a 2–0 loss at Real Madrid. On 10 August, he made a contract extension with the club running until June 2013.

After the 2011 summer signing of Joaquín, Portillo was further demoted down in Málaga's pecking order, not making the 18-men squad in most of the matches. His first league appearance of the season only came on 9 April 2012, as he played the last eight minutes in a 3−0 home victory over Racing de Santander.

On 15 September 2012, Portillo scored his first goal as a professional, with a beautiful volley in a 3−1 home defeat of Levante UD. He appeared in 38 competitive games during the campaign, including eight in the side's first-ever participation in the UEFA Champions League.

On 15 January 2015, Portillo was loaned to Segunda División's Real Betis until June, with an obligatory buyout clause if the team was promoted. After contributing 21 appearances in the season, he signed a permanent three-year deal with the club.

Portillo was loaned to Getafe CF of the second tier on 31 August 2016, for one year. After achieving promotion, he was bought outright on 3 July 2017.

On 22 July 2021, free agent Portillo signed a two-year contract with UD Almería in the second division.

Honours
Betis
Segunda División: 2014–15

Almería
Segunda División: 2021–22

References

External links

1990 births
Living people
Spanish footballers
Footballers from Málaga
Association football midfielders
La Liga players
Segunda División players
Tercera División players
Atlético Malagueño players
Málaga CF players
Real Betis players
Getafe CF footballers
UD Almería players